{{DISPLAYTITLE:C6H6O6}}
The molecular formula C6H6O6 (molar mass: 174.11 g/mol, exact mass: 174.0164 u) may refer to:

 Acetic oxalic anhydride
 Aconitic acid
 Benzenehexol
 Dehydroascorbic acid (DHA)
 1,2,3,4,5,6,-hexa hydroxy benzen